Bruiser Queen is the second album by the American alternative rock band Cake Like, released in 1997.

Production
The album was produced by Craig Wedren and Carl Glanville. Ric Ocasek had produced "Mr. Fireman", for an earlier EP, and recommended the band to Neil Young, who signed them to his Vapor Records imprint. Kerri Kenney wrote most of the album's lyrics.

Critical reception

MTV wrote that "Kenney tries to stretch her low, atonally growly voice to perform Sonic Youth's Gordon-like tricks but lacks the attitude and passion behind the vocal." The Washington Post called the album "fairly slick in its minimalist way," writing that "although its style is spare and jittery, Cake Like can be glib, especially when celebrating sex with the traditional heat-seeking of 'Latin Lover' and 'Mr. Fireman'." 

The New York Times opined that "with a sound that fits right in with the cool downtown experimental rock scene, and lyrics that blend equal parts unrestrained sarcasm and unbridled emotion, Cake Like proves that in the grown-up world, popular girls can take chances, too." Scripps Howard wrote: "Rising above their sparse, simplistic arrangements—which tend to be of the monochromatic punk/folk variety—[Nina] Hellman and Kenney plow through their weirdly hostile songs like neo-beatniks at a poetry slam." 

AllMusic thought that Cake Like "does manage a few solid tunes, particularly the Teenage Fanclub-style playfulness of 'Lorraine's Car' and the punky 'Pretty New', but overall Bruiser Queen is a botch."

Track listing

Personnel
Nina Hellman - guitar, vocals
Kerri Kenney - bass, vocals
Jody Seifert - drums

References

1997 albums